Brücken or Brucken may refer to:

Places in Germany

Brücken, Birkenfeld, municipality in the district of Birkenfeld, Rhineland-Palatinate
Brücken, Kusel, municipality in the district of Kusel, Rhineland-Palatinate 
Brücken, Saxony-Anhalt, municipality in the district of Mansfeld-Südharz, Saxony-Anhalt

People

Claudia Brücken (born 1963), German singer who fronted the groups Propaganda and Act
Gerard von Brucken Fock (1859–1935), classical Dutch pianist, composer and painter